Murine respirovirus, formerly Sendai virus (SeV) and previously also known as murine parainfluenza virus type 1 or hemagglutinating virus of Japan (HVJ), is an enveloped, 150-200 nm–diameter, negative sense, single-stranded RNA virus of the family Paramyxoviridae. It typically infects rodents and it is not pathogenic for humans or domestic animals

Sendai virus (SeV) is a member of the genus Respirovirus. The virus was isolated in the city of Sendai in Japan in the early 1950s. Since then, it has been actively used in research as a model pathogen. The virus is infectious for many cancer cell lines (see below), and has oncolytic properties demonstrated in animal models and in naturally-occurring cancers in animals. SeV's ability to fuse eukaryotic cells and to form syncytium was used to produce hybridoma cells capable of manufacturing monoclonal antibodies in large quantities.

Recent applications of SeV-based vectors include the reprogramming of somatic cells into induced pluripotent stem cells and vaccine creation. For vaccination purpose the Sendai virus-based constructs could be delivered in a form of nasal drops, which may be beneficial in inducing a mucosal immune response. SeV has several features that are important in a vector for a successful vaccine: the virus does not integrate into the host genome, it does not undergo genetic recombination, it replicates only in the cytoplasm without DNA intermediates or a nuclear phase and it is does not cause any disease in humans or domestic animals. Sendai virus is used as a backbone for vaccine development against Mycobacterium tuberculosis that causes tuberculosis, against HIV-1 that causes AIDS and against other viruses, including those that cause severe respiratory infections in children.  The latter include Human Respiratory Syncytial Virus (HRSV), Human Metapneumovirus (HMPV) and Human Parainfluenza Viruses (HPIV).

The vaccine studies against M. tuberculosis, HMPV, HPIV1 and, HPIV2  are in the pre-clinical stage, against HRSV a phase I clinical trail has been completed. The phase I clinical studies of SeV-based vaccination were also completed for HPIV1. They were done in adults and in 3- to 6-year-old children. As a result of vaccination against HPIV1 a significant boost in virus-specific neutralizing antibodies was observed. A SeV-based vaccine development against HIV-1 has reached a phase II clinical trial. In Japan intranasal Sendai virus-based SARS-CoV-2 vaccine was created and tested in a mouse model.

As an infection agent 
SeV replication occurs exclusively in the cytoplasm of the host cell. The virus is using its own RNA polymerase. One replication cycle takes approximately 12–15 hours with one cell yielding thousands of virions.

Susceptible animals 
The virus is responsible for a highly transmissible respiratory tract infection in mice, hamsters, guinea pigs, rats, and occasionally marmosets, with infection passing through both air and direct contact routes. Natural infection occurs by way of the respiratory tract. In animal facility airborne transmission can occur over a distance of 5–6 feet as well as through air handling systems. The virus can be detected in mouse colonies worldwide, generally in suckling to young adult mice. A study in France reported antibodies to SeV in 17% of mouse colonies examined. Epizootic infections of mice are usually associated with a high mortality rate, while enzootic disease patterns suggest that the virus is latent and can be cleared over the course of a year. Sub-lethal exposure to SeV can promote long-lasting immunity to further lethal doses of SeV. The virus is immunosuppressive and may predispose to secondary bacterial infections. There are no scientific studies, which were performed using modern detection methods, which would identify SeV as an infectious and decease causative for humans or domestic animals.

Variable susceptibility to infection in mouse and rat strains 
Inbred and outbred mouse and rat strains have very different susceptibility to Sendai virus infection. Visualization of SeV infection in live animals demonstrates this difference. The 129/J mice tested were approximately 25,000-fold more sensitive than SJL/J mice. C57BL/6 mice are highly resistant to the virus, while DBA/2J mice are sensitive. C57BL/6 mice showed slight loss of body weight after SeV administration, which returned to normal later. Only 10% mortality rate was observed in C57BL/6 mice after the administration of very high virulent dose of 1*105 TCID50. It was shown that resistance to the lethal effects of Sendai virus in mice is genetically controlled and expressed through control of viral replication within the first 72 hours of infection. Treatment of both strains with exogenous IFN before and during viral infection led to an increase in survival time in C57BL/6 mice, but all animals of both strains ultimately succumb to SeV caused disease. If a mouse survives a SeV infection, it develops a lifelong immunity to subsequent viral infections.

There are SeV-resistant F344 rats and susceptible BN rats.

Course of infection 
In the host airways the virus titer reaches a peak after 5–6 days post infection initiation that decreases to undetectable levels by day 14. The virus promotes a descending respiratory infection, which begins in the nasal passages, passes through the trachea into the lungs and causes necrosis of the respiratory epithelium. The necrosis is mild in the first few days of infection, but later became severe by peaking around day 5. By day 9, the cells of the surface of the airways regenerate. Focal interstitial pneumonia can developed accompanied by inflammation and lesions of various degrees on the lungs. Usually, the respiratory system shows signs of healing within 3 weeks of infection, however, residual lesions, inflammation, or permanent scarring can occur. 6–8 days after the infection initiation serum antibodies appear. They remain detectable for about 1 year.

Symptoms in animals 
 Sneezing
 Hunched posture
 Respiratory distress
 Porphyrin discharge from eyes and/or nose
 Lethargy
 Failure to thrive in surviving babies and young rats
 Anorexia

Diagnosis and prophylaxis
SeV induces lesions within the respiratory tract, usually associated with bacterial inflammation of the trachea and lung (tracheitis and bronchopneumonia, respectively). However, the lesions are limited, and aren't indicative solely of SeV infection. Detection, therefore, makes use of SeV-specific antigens in several serological methods, including ELISA, immunofluorescence, and hemagglutination assays, with particular emphasis on use of the ELISA for its high sensitivity (unlike the hemagglutination assay) and its fairly early detection (unlike the immunofluorescence assay).

In a natural setting, the respiratory infection of Sendai virus in mice is acute. From the extrapolation of the infection of laboratory mice, the presence of the virus may first be detected in the lungs 48 to 72 hours following exposure. As the virus replicates in the respiratory tract of an infected mouse, the concentration of the virus grows most quickly during the third day of infection. After that, the growth of the virus is slower but consistent. Typically, the peak concentration of the virus is on the sixth or seventh day, and rapid decline follows that by the ninth day. A fairly vigorous immune response mounted against the virus is the cause of this decline. The longest period of detected presence of the virus in a mouse lung is fourteen days after infection.

Eaton et al. advises that, when controlling an outbreak of SeV, disinfecting the laboratory environment and vaccinating the breeders, as well as eliminating infected animals and screening incoming animals, should clear the problem very quickly. Imported animals should be vaccinated with SeV and placed in quarantine, while, in the laboratory environment, breeding programs should be discontinued, and the non-breeding adults isolated for two months.

Virus induced immunosuppression 
The virus is a powerful immunomodulator. SeV can act in both directions: it can activate or suppress the immune response depending on the type of cell, host and time period after infection initiation. The virus can suppress the IFN production and response pathways as well as inflammation pathway.

Apoptosis inhibition 
Sendai virus P gene encodes a nested set of proteins (C', C, Y1 and Y2), which are named to collectively as the C proteins (see the section "genome structure" below). C proteins of SeV are able to suppress apoptosis. The antiapoptotic activity of the C proteins supports SeV infection in the host cells.

Interferon production and signal transduction inhibition 
The virus prevents the stimulation of type 1 IFN production and subsequent cell apoptosis in response to virus infection by inhibiting the activation of IRF-3. Two virus proteins: C and V are mainly involved in this process. SeV can attenuate cell defense mechanisms and allow itself to escape from host innate immunity by inhibiting the interferon response pathway in addition to inhibiting the interferon production. The table below demonstrates the inhibition mechanism.

Anti-IFN activity of C protein is shared across the family Paramyxoviridae, and therefore appears to play an important role in paramyxovirus immune evasion. Human Parainfluenza Virus type 1 (HPIV1), which is a close relative of SeV and is (in contrast to SeV) a successful human pathogen, does not express V proteins, only C proteins. So, all needed functions provided by V in SeV can be provided by C in HPIV1. Thus, C and V have these "overlapping functions" because of the multi-faceted nature of host defense that can be countered at so many places, and exactly how well and where will in part explain host restriction.

Host restriction and safety for domestic animals 
Currently, there is no scientific data obtained using modern detection methods that would identify SeV as an infectious - disease causing agent for humans or domestic animals. Modern methods for the identification of pathogenic microorganisms have never detected SeV in pigs or other domestic animals, despite the isolation of other paramyxoviruses. Consequently, it is recognized that Sendai virus disease causing infection is host restrictive for rodents and the virus does not cause disease in humans or domestic animals, which are natural hosts for their own parainfluenza viruses. After experimental SeV infection the virus can replicate and shed from the upper and lower respiratory tract of African green monkeys and chimpanzees, but it is not causing any disease. Sendai virus has been used and demonstrated high safety profile in clinical trials involving both adults and children to immunize against human parainfluenza virus type 1, since the two viruses share common antigenic determinants and trigger the generation of cross-reactive neutralizing antibodies. The study that was published in 2011 demonstrated that SeV neutralizing antibodies (which were formed due to human parainfluenza virus type 1 past infection) can be detected in 92.5% of human subjects worldwide with a median EC50 titer of 60.6 and values ranging from 5.9–11,324. Low anti-SeV antibodies background does not block the ability of SeV-base vaccine to promote antigen-specific T cell immunity.

Historic safety concerns 
In 1952, Kuroya and his colleagues attempted to identify an infectious agent in human tissue samples at Tohoku University Hospital, Sendai, Japan. The samples were taken from the lung of a newborn child that was affected by fatal pneumonia. The primary isolate from the samples was passaged in mice and subsequently in embryonated eggs.  The isolated infectious agent was later called Sendai virus, which was used interchangeably with the name “Hemagglutinating Virus of Japan”. Kuroya and his colleagues were convinced that they isolated the virus, which is a new etiological agent for human respiratory infections. Later in 1954, Fukumi and his colleagues at the Japan National Institute of Health put forward an alternative explanation for the origin of the virus. It was suggested that the mice used to passage the virus were infected with the mouse virus. Thus, mouse virus was later transferred to embryonated eggs, isolated and finally named the Sendai virus. This explanation of Fukumi, pointing to the mouse rather than the human origin of the virus, has been supported by numerous scientific data later. The historical aspects of the Sendai virus isolation and controversy behind it are well described in the review. Thus, for some time, it was erroneously assumed that Sendai virus is human disease causing pathogen. The incorrect assumption that the virus was isolated from human infectious material is still reported by Encyclopædia Britannica and by ATCC in the description of the history of the viral isolate Sendai/52. It was also believed that the virus could cause disease not only in humans but also in pigs, because antibodies to the virus were often found in their organisms during the swine epidemic in Japan in 1953–1956. High incidence of seropositivity to the virus was observed in pigs in 15 districts of Japan.  An explanation was later found for this widespread detection of antibodies (see the section below). Yet, despite overwhelming evidence that indicate that SeV is host restrictive rodent pathogen, in some veterinary manuals. and safety leaflets, SeV is still listed as a virus that can cause disease in pigs. Similar information is provided by Encyclopædia Britannica. In reality, the multiple isolates of paramyxoviruses in pigs, using modern nucleic acid sequencing methods, have never been identified as SeV.

Antigenic stability and cross-reactive antibodies 
All viruses in the family Paramyxoviridae are antigenically stable; therefore the family representatives that are close relatives and belong to the same genus, most likely, share common antigenic determinants. Thus, porcine parainfluenza 1, which has high sequence homology with SeV and also belongs to the same genus Respirovirus as SeV, probably, has cross-reactive antibodies with SeV. Perhaps the porcine parainfluenza 1 was responsible for pigs disease in Japan in 1953–1956. However, the antigenic cross-reactivity among these two representatives within the genus Respirovirus may explain why SeV antibodies were found in sick pigs, and why it was thought that SeV was the etiological causative agent of pigs disease. Human parainfluenza virus type 1, also shares common antigenic determinants with SeV and triggers the generation of cross-reactive neutralizing antibodies. This fact can explain wide spread detection of SeV antibodies in humans in the 1950s-1960s. Recently published study also showed this wide spread detection. The study that was published in 2011 demonstrated that SeV neutralizing antibodies (which were formed due to human parainfluenza virus type 1 past infection) can be detected in 92.5% of human subjects worldwide with a median EC50 titer of 60.6 and values ranging from 5.9–11,324. Low anti-SeV antibodies background does not block the ability of SeV-base vaccine to promote antigen-specific T cell immunity.

Virus shedding in airways of non-natural hosts 
Sendai virus administration to non-natural hosts results in shedding virions in the airways. Thus, 10 hours later after intranasal SeV administration, infectious virions carrying foreign trans genes can be detected in sheep's’ lungs.  Moreover, SeV replicates to detectable levels in the upper and lower respiratory tract of African green monkeys and chimpanzees.

Virus induced antiviral immunity 
SeV can overcome antiviral mechanisms in some of its natural hosts (some rodents), but the virus is ineffective in overcoming these mechanisms in some other organisms that are virus resistant. Both innate and adaptive immunity promote efficient recovery from SeV infection. Using the mechanisms outlined in three sections below the virus stimulates the production of interferons and other cytokines that provide protection against viruses.

SeV stimulates interferon production and transduction pathway 
The main component of innate antiviral response is type I interferons (IFNs) production and most cells can produce type I IFNs, including IFN-α and -β. The recognition by cellular molecules that are called pattern recognition receptors (PRR) of triggering viral elements, such as the virus genomic RNA, the replication intermediary double-stranded RNA, or the viral ribonucleoproteins, promotes IFN production and response pathways. Viral genomic and protein components can bind variable PRRs and stimulate a signaling pathway that results in the activation of the transcription factors, which relocate to nucleus and trigger type I IFNs transcription.

Interferon production 
Because of powerful interferon stimulating properties, before recombinant interferon alpha became available for medical use, SeV was selected, among other viruses, for the industrial large-scale IFN production. A procedure involving inactivated SeV treatment of human peripheral blood leukocytes from donors’ blood was used for this production.

Below is a table that listed known PRRs and interferon regulatory factors that are getting activated upon SeV infection.

Many different cells can produce interferon in response to SeV

Interferon response pathway protects some cells from SeV infection 
SeV can stimulate and/or inhibit the IFN-beta response pathway depending on the type of cell and host. If SeV triggers IFN production, the produced IFN further protects cells from next rounds of SeV infection. Multiple examples of IFN-beta protecting cells from SeV are described. Pretreatment of human lung fibroblasts MRC-5 cells with IFN-beta inhibits the replication of SeV.

A similar IFN-beta protection against the virus has been observed for some human malignant cells that maintain the IFN response pathway. HeLa cells can be infected with SeV; however, incubation of these cells with IFN-beta causes inhibition of SeV replication. Multiple interferon stimulated genes (ISG) were identified as being required for this inhibition including IRF-9, TRIM69, NPIP, TDRD7, PNPT1 and so on.  One of this genes TDRD7 was investigated in more detail. The functional TDRD7 protein inhibits the replication of SeV and other paramyxoviruses, suppressing autophagy, which is necessary for productive infection with these viruses.

SeV also triggers the expression of IFN induced Ifit2 protein that is involved in protecting mice from SeV through as yet unknown mechanism.  In addition, SeV triggers the expression of the chemokine interferon-γ inducible protein 10 kDa (CXCL10), which is involved in chemotaxis, induction of apoptosis, regulation of cell growth and mediation of angiostatic effects. Human mast cell infection with SeV induces expression of interferon-stimulated genes MxA and IFIT3 in addition to activation of expression of type 1 IFN, MDA-5, RIG-1 and TLR-3.

SeV stimulation of production of inflammatory cytokines, infammasomes and beta-defensins

Cytokines 
Sendai virus can induce the production of many cytokines that enhance cellular immune responses. Some evidence that demonstrates that SeV activates the transcription factor NF-κB and this activation helps in protection against SeV infection. SeV can stimulate the production of macrophage inflammatory protein-1α (MIB-1α) and –β (MIB-1β), RANTES (CCL5), tumor necrosis factor-alpha (TNF-alpha), tumor necrosis factor-beta (TNF-beta), interleukin-6 (IL-6 ), interleukin-8 (IL-8), interleukin-1 alpha (IL1A), interleukin-1 beta (IL1B), platelet-derived growth factor (PDGF-AB) and small concentrations of interleukin-2 (IL2) and GM-CSF. Even plasmids that deliver the F-coding gene of SeV to tumor cells in model animals trigger the production of RANTES (CCL5) in tumor-infiltrated T-lymphocytes. SeV induces the production of B cell-activating factor by monocytes and by some other cells. Heat-inactivated SeV virus induces the production of IL-10 and IL-6 cytokines by dendritic cells (DC). Most likely, F protein is responsible for this induction because reconstituted liposomes containing F protein can stimulate IL-6 production by DC. The production of IL-6 in response to SeV infection is restricted to conventional dendritic cells (DCs]) subsets, such as CD4+ and double negative (dnDC).

The UV-inactivated SeV (and likely the alive virus as well) can stimulate dendritic cells to secrete chemokines and cytokines such as interleukin-6, interferon-beta, chemokine (C-C motif) ligand 5, and chemokine (C-X-C motif) ligand 10. These molecules activate both CD8+ T cells as well as natural killer cells.  UV-inactivated SeV triggers the production of an intercellular adhesion molecule -1 (ICAM-1, CD54), which is a glycoprotein that serves as a ligand for macrophage-1 antigen (Mac-1) and lymphocyte function-associated antigen 1 (LFA-1 (integrin)). This induced production happens through the activation of NF-κB downstream of the mitochondrial antiviral signaling pathway and the RIG-I. The increased concentration of ICAM-1 on the cells surface increases the vulnerability of these cells to natural killer cells. It has been shown in the Namalwa cells that SeV virus stimulates an expression of many genes involved in immune defense pathways, such as type I and type II IFN signaling, as well as cytokine signaling. Among the ten most virus-induced mRNAs are IFNα8, IFNα13, IFNβ, IFNλ: (L28α, IL28β, IL29), OASL, CXCL10, CXCL11 and HERC5.

Stimulation of inflammasome helps protect against SeV infection 
Using human embryonic kidney cells (HEK 293T) it has been shown that SeV can stimulate production of a pattern recognition receptor NLRC5, which is a cytosolic protein expressed mainly in hematopoietic cells. This production activates the cryopyrin (NALP3) inflammasome. Using human monocytic cell line-1 (THP-1) it has been shown that SeV can activate signal transduction by mitochondrial antiviral-signaling protein signaling (MAVS), which is a mitochondria-associated adaptor molecule that is required for optimal NALP3-inflammasome activity. Through MAVS signaling SeV stimulates the oligomerization of NALP3 and triggers NALP3-dependent activation of caspase-1 that, in turn, stimulates caspase 1-dependent production of interleukine -1 beta (IL-1β).

Stimulation of beta-defensin production 
SeV is a very effective stimulant of expression of human beta-defensin-1 (hBD-1). This protein is a member of the beta-defensin family of proteins that bridges innate and adaptive immune responses to a pathogen infection. In response to SeV infection, the production of hBD-1 mRNA and protein increases 2 hours after exposure to the virus in purified plasmacytoid dendritic cells or in PBMC.

Long-term antiviral immunity 
After viral infection in rodents, type I IFNs promote SeV clearance and speed up the migration and maturation of dendritic cells. However, soon after viral infection, animals efficiently generate cytotoxic T cells independently of type I IFN signaling and clear the virus from their lungs. Moreover, even the animals that are unresponsive to type I IFN develop long-term anti-SeV immunity in a form of memory response that includes generation of CD8+ T cells and neutralizing antibodies. This memory response can protect animals against further challenge with a lethal dose of virus.

Phosphorylation 
SeV infection causes changes in a host cell protein phosphorylation, triggering phosphorylation of at least of 1347 host proteins.

As an oncolytic agent 
Sendai virus-based anticancer therapy for model and companion animals has been reported in several scientific papers. The described studies demonstrate that Sendai virus has a potential of becoming a safe and effective therapeutic agent against a wide range of human cancers. High genomic stability of SeV is a very desirable trait for oncolytic viruses. SeV is not likely to evolve into a pathogenic strain or into a virus with decreased oncolytic potential. The cytoplasmic replication of the virus results in a lack of host genome integration and recombination, which makes SeV safer and more attractive candidate for broadly used therapeutic oncolysis compared to some DNA viruses or retroviruses.

Safety for humans 
One of the great advantages of the Sendai virus as a potential oncolytic agent is its safety. Even though the virus is widespread in rodent colonies and has been used in laboratory research for decades, it has never been observed that it can cause human disease. Moreover, Sendai virus has been used in clinical trials involving both adults and children to immunize against human parainfluenza virus type 1, since the two viruses share common antigenic determinants and trigger the generation of cross-reactive neutralizing antibodies.The Sendai virus administration in the form of nasal drops in doses ranging from 5 × 105  50% embryo infectious dose (EID50) to 5 × 107 EID50 induced the production of neutralizing antibodies to the human virus without any measurable side effects.The results of these trials represent additional evidence of Sendai virus safety for humans.The development of T cell-based AIDS vaccines using Sendai virus vectors reached phase II clinical trial. Evaluation of the safety and immunogenicity of an intranasally administered replication-competent Sendai Virus–vectored HIV Type 1 gag vaccine demonstrated: induction of potent T-Cell and antibody responses in prime-boost regimens. Sendai virus also used as a backbone for vaccine against respiratory syncytial virus (RSV).

Model cancers 
For cancer studies, it is desirable that the oncolytic virus be non-pathogenic for experimental animals, but the Sendai virus can cause rodent disease, which is a problem for research strategies. Two approaches have been used to overcome this problem and make Sendai virus non-pathogenic for mice and rats. One of these approaches included the creation of a set of genetically modified attenuated viral strains. Representatives of this set were tested on model animals carrying a wide range of transplantable human tumors. It has been shown that they can cause suppression or even eradication of fibrosarcoma, neuroblastoma, hepatocellular carcinoma, melanoma, squamous cell and prostate carcinomas. SeV construct suppresses micrometastasis of head and neck squamous cell carcinoma in an orthotopic nude mouse model. Complete eradication of established gliosarcomas in immunocompetent rats has also been observed. SeV constructs have also been created with a modified protease cleavage site in the F-protein. The modification allowed the recombinant virus to specifically infect cancer cells that expressed the corresponding proteases.

Another approach of making Sendai virus non-pathogenic included the short-term treatment of the virions with ultraviolet light. Such treatment causes a loss of the virus replication ability. However, even this replication-deficient virus can induce the cancer cells death and stimulate anti-tumor immunity. It can trigger extensive apoptosis of human glioblastoma cells in culture, and it can efficiently suppress the growth of these cells in model animals. The ultraviolet light treated virus can also kill human prostate cancer cells in culture by triggering their apoptosis and eradicate tumors that originated from these cells in immunodeficient model animals. Moreover, it can stimulate immunomodulated tumor regression of colon and kidney cancers in immunocompetent mice. Similar regressions caused by the replication-deficient Sendai virus have been observed in animals with transplanted melanoma tumors.

Natural cancers 
Some cancer studies with non-rodent animals have been performed with the unmodified Sendai virus. Thus, after intratumoral injections of the virus, complete or partial remission of mast cell tumors (mastocytomas) was observed in dogs affected by this disease. Short-term remission after an intravenous injection of SeV was described in a patient with acute leukemia treated in the Clinical Research Center of University Hospitals of Cleveland (USA) by multiple viruses in 1964. It is also reported that the Moscow strain of SeV was tested by Dr. V. Senin and his team as an anticancer agent in a few dozen patients affected by various malignancies with metastatic growth in Russia in the 1990s. The virus was injected intradermally or intratumorally and it caused fever in less than half of the treated patients, which usually disappeared within 24 hours. Occasionally, the virus administration caused inflammation of the primary tumor and metastases. Clinical outcomes were variable. A small proportion of treated patients experienced pronounced long-term remission with the disappearance of primary tumors and metastases. Sometimes the remission lasted 5–10 years or more after virotherapy. Brief descriptions of the medical records of the patients that experiences long-term remission are presented in the patent. Intratumoral injection of UV irradiated and inactivated SeV resulted in an antitumor effect in a few melanoma patients with stage IIIC or IV progressive disease with skin or lymph metastasis. Complete or partial responses were observed in approximately half of injected and noninjected target lesions.

Anticancer mechanism

Direct cancer cells killing. Malignant cells are vulnerable to SeV infection. 
Sendai virus can infect and kill variable cancer cells (see section Sensitive cell lines and virus strains). However, some malignant cells are resistant to SeV infection. There are multiple explanations for such resistance. Not all cancer cells have cell entry receptors for the virus and not all cancer cells express virus processing serine proteases. There are also other mechanisms that can make a cancer cell resistant to an oncolytic virus. For example, some cancer cells maintain interferon response system that completely or partially protects a host cells from a virus infection. Therefore, biomarkers needed to be developed to identify tumors that might succumb to SeV mediated oncolysis.

Sendai virus cell entry receptors are often overexpressed in cancer cells.
SeV receptors are potential biomarkers for evaluation of the vulnerability of malignant cells to the virus. They represented by glycoproteins and glycolipids (see section "SeV cell entry receptors").The expression of some molecules that can facilitate SeV cell entry (see section “SeV cell entry receptors”), frequently, accelerates carcinogenesis and/or metastasis development. For example, the presence of Sialyl-Lewisx antigen (cluster of differentiation 15s (CD15s)), which is one of SeV cell entry receptors, on the outer cell membrane, correlates with invasion potential of malignant cells, tumor recurrence, and overall patient survival for an extremely wide range of cancers. Therefore, SeV virus preferentially can enter such cells. Another example is represented by some other molecules that incorporate sialic acids residues, which are SeV cell entry receptors. Metastatic cancer cells frequently express a high density of glycoproteins or glycolipids - molecules that are rich in sialic acid. Expression of the Vim2 antigen, which is another SeV cell entry receptor, is very important for the extravascular infiltration process of acute myeloid leukemia cells. GD1a, ganglioside  also serves as SeV receptor and is found in large quantities on the surfaces of breast cancer stem cells. High cell surface expression of another SeV receptor - ganglioside sialosylparagloboside /SPG/ NeuAcα2-3PG. characterizes lymphoid leukemia cells. Among other receptors represented by gangliosides GT1b is highly expressed on the outer membranes of brain metastases cells that originate from an extremely broad range of cancer,  while GD1a, GT1b and GQ1b can be detected in human gliosarcomas. However, their quantity is not exceeding the quantity in normal frontal cerebral cortex. The asialoglycoprotein receptors that bind Sendai virus. and serve as SeV cell entry receptors are highly expressed in liver cancers.

Cellular expression of glycoproteins can be evaluated by various molecular biology methods, which include RNA and protein measurements. However, cellular expression of gangliosides, which are sialic acid-containing glycosphingolipids, cannot be evaluated by these methods. Instead, it can be measured using anti-glycan antibodies, and despite the large collection of such antibodies in a community resource database, they are not always available for each ganglioside. Therefore, indirect measurement of ganglioside expression by quantifying the levels of fucosyltransferases and glycosyltransferases that complete glycan synthesis is an alternative. There is evidence that expression of these enzymes and the production of gangliosides strongly correlate. At least four representatives of fucosyltransferases and several glycosyltransferases including sialyltransferases are responsible for the synthesis of gangliosides that can serve as SeV receptors. All these proteins are often overexpressed in various tumors, and their expression levels correlate with the metastatic status of the tumor and the shorter life span of the patients. Thus, these enzymes are also potential biomarkers of SeV-oncolytic infectivity

Sendai virus proteolytic processing enzymes are often overexpressed in cancer cells.
The fusion protein (F) of SeV is synthesized as an inactive precursor and is activated by proteolytic cleavage of the host cell serine proteases (see the section “Proteolytic cleavage by cellular proteases” below). Some of these proteases are overexpressed in malignant neoplasms. For example, transmembrane serine protease 2 (TMPRSS2), which is an F-protein-processing enzyme, is often overexpressed in prostate cancer cells. It is also overexpressed in some cell lines originating from various malignant neoplasms. Thus, it is highly expressed in bladder carcinoma, human colon carcinoma CaCo2 and breast carcinomas SK-BR-3, MCF7 and T-47d. Another F-protein-protease is tryptase beta 2 (TPSB2). This protease (with alias such as tryptase-Clara and mast cell tryptase) is expressed in normal club cells and mast cells, and in some cancers. It's especially high expression is observed in the human mast cell line HMC-1, and in the human erythroleukemia cell line HEL. Plasminogen (PLG), from which originates the mini-plasmin that can cleave the F-protein, is highly expressed in liver cancers. Its expression is also increased in a wide range of other malignant neoplasms. Factor X (F10) is frequently expressed in normal liver and in liver cancers. SeV constructs were created with a modified protease cleavage site. The modification allowed the recombinant virus to specifically infect cancer cells that expressed the corresponding proteases, which can cleave a modified protease cleavage site.

Defects in the interferon system 
The interferon production and / or response system often malfunctions in malignant cells; therefore, they are much more vulnerable to infection with oncolytic viruses compared to normal cells Thus, cells belonging to three human cell lines, originated from variable malignancies, such as U937, Namalwa, and A549, retain their ability to become infected with SeV even after treatment with type 1 IFN. Interferon response system is broken in these cells and it cannot protect them from SeV infection.

In Namalwa cells SeV virus stimulates an expression of many genes involved in immune defense pathways, such as type I and type II IFN signaling, as well as cytokine signaling. Among the ten most virus-induced mRNAs are IFNα8, IFNα13, IFNβ, IFNλ: (L28α, IL28β, IL29), OASL, CXCL10, CXCL11 and HERC5. However, despite stimulation of these genes expression by SeV, Namalwa cells can't protect themselves from the virus infection.

Ability of Sendai virus to inhibit interferon response in some cancer cells 
In HeLa cells SeV (in contrast to Vesicular Stomatitis Virus) can counteract IFN-α pretreatment and keep a viral protein translation level similar to that in IFN-untreated cells.

Activation of a necroptotic pathway in malignant cells 
It has been shown, using fibrosarcoma cell line L929, that SeV is able to induce malignant cell death through necroptosis. This type of cell death is highly immunogenic because dying necroptotic cells release damage-associated molecular pattern (DAMPs) molecules, which initiate adaptive immunity. The necroptotic pathway, triggered by SeV, requires RIG-I activation and the presence of SeV encoded proteins Y1 and/or Y2.

Virus, mediated fusion of cancer cells, kills them faster 

The host organism fights viral infection using various strategies. One such strategy is the production of neutralizing antibodies. In response to this production, viruses have developed their own strategies for spreading the infection and avoiding the inactivation by the host produced neutralizing antibodies. Some viruses, and in particular paramyxoviruses, can produce new virus particles by fusing infected and healthy host cells. This fusion leads to the formation of a large multi-nuclear structure (syncytium). Sendai virus, as a representative of Paramyxoviridae, uses this strategy to spread its infection (see the section “Directed cell fusion” below). The virus can fuse up to 50-100 cells adjacent to one primary infected cell. This multi-nuclear formation, derived from several dozens of cells, survives for several days and subsequently releases functional viral particles.

It has been demonstrated that the ability of a virus to destroy tumor cells increases along with an increase in the ability of the virus to form large multi-nuclear structures. The transfer of genes that are responsible for the formation of syncytium from the representative of Paramyxoviridae to the representatives of Rhabdoviridae or Herpesviridae makes the recipient viruses more oncolytic. Moreover, the oncolytic potential of paramyxovirus can be enhanced by mutations in the fusion (F) gene protease-cleavage site, which allows the F-protein to be more efficiently processed by cellular proteases. The introduction of the F gene of SeV in the form of a plasmid into the tumor tissue in mice by electroporation showed that the expression of the F gene increases the T cell infiltration of the tumor with CD4 + and CD8 + cells and inhibits tumor growth. It was also shown in other similar experiments that cancer cells themselves, transfected with plasmids that encode viral membrane glycoproteins with fusion function, cause the collective death of neighboring cells forming syncytium with them. Recruitment of bystander cells into the syncytium leads to significant regression of the tumor.

Killing of malignant cells by virus triggered anti-tumor immunity 
The virus triggers indirect immunomodulated death of malignant cells using a number of mechanisms, which are described in a published review. The viral enzyme neuraminidase (NA), which has sialidase activity, can make cancer cells more visible to the immune system by removing sialic acid residues from the surface of malignant cells. SeV activates natural killer cells (NK), cytotoxic T lymphocytes (CTL) and dendritic cells (DC). The secretion of interleukin-6, that is triggered by the virus, also inhibits regulatory T cells.

Stimulation of the secretion of cytokines

Interferons 
Type I and type II interferons have anticancer activity (see the "Function" section in the "Interferon" article). Interferons can promote expression of major histocompatibility complex molecules, MHC I and MHC II, and stimulate immunoproteasome activity. All interferons drastically increase the presentation of MHC I dependent antigens. Interferon gamma (IFN-gamma) also strongly promotes the MHC II-dependent presentation of antigens. Higher MHC I expression leads to higher presentation of viral and abnormal peptides from cancer cells to cytotoxic T cells, while the immunoproteasome more efficiently processes these peptides for loading onto the MHC I molecule. Therefore,  the recognition and killing of infected or malignant cells increases. Higher MHC II expression enhances presentation of viral and cancer peptides to helper T cells; which are releasing cytokines (such as more interferons, interleukins and other cytokines) that stimulate and co-ordinate the activity of other immune cells.

By down regulation of angiogenic stimuli produced by tumor cells interferon can also suppress angiogenesis In addition, they suppress the proliferation of endothelial cells. Such suppression causes a decrease in tumor vascularization and subsequent growth inhibition. Interferons can directly activate immune cells including macrophages and natural killer cells. INF-1 and interferon gamma (IFN-γ) production are triggered by SeV molecular components in many cells (See "Virus induced antiviral immunity" section above). It has been demonstrated that SeV can also induce the production of IFN type III (IFN-lambda) by human plasmacytoid dendritic cells.

Non interferons 
Sendai virus can induce the production of many cytokines that enhance cellular immune responses against cancer cells. SeV stimulates the production of macrophage inflammatory protein-1α (MIB-1α) and –β (MIB-1β), RANTES (CCL5), tumor necrosis factor-alpha (TNF-alpha), tumor necrosis factor-beta (TNF-beta), interleukin-6 (IL-6 ), interleukin-8 (IL-8), interleukin-1 alpha (IL1A), interleukin-1 beta (IL1B), platelet-derived growth factor (PDGF-AB) and small concentrations of interleukin-2 (IL2) and GM-CSF. Even plasmids that deliver the F-coding gene of SeV to tumor cells in model animals trigger the production of RANTES (CCL5) in tumor-infiltrated T-lymphocytes.

SeV induces the production of B cell-activating factor by monocytes and by some other cells.

Heat-inactivated SeV virus induces the production of IL-10 and IL-6 cytokines by dendritic cells (DC). Most likely, F protein is responsible for this induction because reconstituted liposomes containing F protein can stimulate IL-6 production by DC. The production of IL-6 in response to SeV infection is restricted to conventional dendritic cells (DCs) subsets, such as CD4+ and double negative (dnDC).

The UV-inactivated SeV (and likely the alive virus as well) can stimulate dendritic cells to secrete chemokines and cytokines such as interleukin-6, interferon-beta, chemokine (C-C motif) ligand 5, and chemokine (C-X-C motif) ligand 10. These molecules activate both CD8+ T cells as well as natural killer cells and attract them to the tumor. It has been shown that in cancer cell lines, UV-inactivated SeV triggers the production of an intercellular adhesion molecule -1 (ICAM-1, CD54), which is a glycoprotein that serves as a ligand for macrophage-1 antigen (Mac-1) and lymphocyte function-associated antigen 1 (LFA-1 (integrin)). Mac-1 and LFA-1 are receptors found on leukocytes. This induced production happens through the activation of nuclear factor-κB downstream of the mitochondrial antiviral signaling pathway and the retinoic acid-inducible gene I. The increased concentration of ICAM-1 on the surface of cancer cells, which is triggered by SeV, increases the vulnerability of these cells to natural killer cells.

Neuraminidase (NA) removal of sialic acid from the surface of malignant cells stimulates natural killers cells and cytotoxic T lymphocytes 
Elevated levels of cell membrane sialylation are associated with increased cancer cell potential for invasion and metastasis and with progression of the malignancy. Some sialylation inhibitors can make cancer cells less malignant.

One possible explanation for the relationship between increased sialylation and a malignant phenotype is that sialylation results in a thick layer of coating on the cell membrane that masks cancer antigens and protects malignant cells from immune surveillance. The activity and cytotoxicity of NK cells is inhibited by the expression of sialic acids on the tumor cell surface. Removal of sialic acid residues from the surface of tumor cells makes them available to NK cells and cytotoxic T lymphocytes and, therefore, reduces their growth potential. Moreover, treating tumor cells with sialidase improves activation of NK cell secretion of IFN-γ.

Some paramyxoviruses, including SeV encode and synthesize neuraminidase (sialidase), which can remove sialic acid residues from the surface of malignant cells. Hemagglutinin-neuraminidase (HN) is a single protein that induces hemagglutination and possesses neuraminidase (sialidase) activity. Neuraminidase (NA), a subunit of the HN protein, binds to and cleaves sialic acid from the cell surface. NA also promotes cell fusion, which helps the nascent virions to avoid contact with host antibodies and thus enables the virus to spread within tissues.

Sialidase treatment of cells causes loss of sialic acid residues. This loss significantly increases the ability of malignant cells to activate cytotoxic T lymphocytes.  Variable sialidases can cause this effect, including NA from Newcastle disease virus that have been shown to cleave 2,3-, 2,6-, and 2,8-linkages between sialic acid residues. In vitro, there was no significant difference between NAs from Newcastle disease virus, SeV and mumps virus with respect to substrate specificity. These results suggest that treating a tumor with the virus results in desialylation of malignant cells, which contributes to increased anti-tumor immune surveillance.  Therefore, the ability of SeV sialidase (NA) to remove sialic acid from the surface of malignant cells most likely helps to ensure the availability of tumor antigens for recognition by cytotoxic T lymphocytes.

Stimulation of natural killer (NK) cells 
Experiments with UV-inactivated SeV showed that NK cells are important in virus-mediated inhibition of tumor growth. This was shown in a mouse model of renal cancer, in which the anti-tumor effect of SeV was suppressed by reducing the number of NK cells by co-injection of specific antibodies.

The activation of NK requires several receptors, among which are natural killer proteins 46 (NKp46) and 44 (NKp44). Studies have shown that the only paramyxovirus protein that activates NK is HN. HN protein binding to NKp46 and/or NKp44 results in the lysis of cells whose surfaces display the HN protein or its fragments. It can be assumed that NK activation and tumor suppression by UV-treated SeV are caused by interaction between HN belonging to SeV, and NKp46 and/or NKp44 receptors belonging to NK cells.

Induction of anti-tumor cytotoxicity of cytotoxic T cells 
SeV even after UV inactivation, being injected intratumorally, can cause tumor infiltration by dendritic cells (DCs) and CD4+ and CD8+ T, and it also can cause enhancing of anti-tumor activity of these cells. Most likely, viral hemagglutinin-neuraminidase protein, highly contributes to the effect (see "Neuraminidase (NA) removal of sialic acid from the surface of malignant cells stimulates natural killers cells and cytotoxic T lymphocytes" section above).This hypothesis is based on two observations. First, the functional hemagglutinin-neuraminidase protein of the oncolytic Newcastle disease virus (NDV), which is a relative of SeV, has been shown to enhance the tumor-specific cytotoxic response of CD8+ T-cells and to increase the activity of CD4+ T-helper cells. Second, UV-inactivated NDV, which is can not replicate, promotes anti-tumor CTL response as well as does intact NDV, which can replicate. Since the hemagglutinin-neuraminidase proteins of the SeV and NDV viruses are highly homologous, it is likely that the HN protein of the SeV virus can activate both CTL and natural killers cell responses. Most likely neuraminidase removal of sialic acid from the surface of malignant cells contributes to this effects.

SeV stimulation of dendritic cells 
UV-inactivated SeV can cause dendritic cells (DCs) to maturate and to infiltrate a tumor. Ex vivo infection of DCs with recombinant non-transmissible SeV induces maturation and activation of DCs within 60 minutes.  When activated DCs that carry  non-transmissible variants of  SeV are administered, survival of animals injected with malignant melanoma, colorectal cancer, squamous cell carcinoma, hepatic cancer, neuroblastoma, and prostate cancer is significantly improved. It has been shown that the administration of such DCs prior to tumor cell injection prevents metastasis of neuroblastoma and prostate adenocarcinoma to the lungs.

SeV can replicate to high titers in human monocyte-derived DCs.  With the multiplicity of infection of 2, approximately 1/3 of the DCs begin to express encoded SeV proteins 8 hours after infection. This proportion increases to 2/3, 24 hours and decreases to 1/3, 48 hours after infection. SeV demonstrates high cytopathic effect on DCs; the virus can kill a third of DC even with a very low multiplicity of infection such as 0.5. Most important observation is that SeV infection triggers DC maturation, which is manifested in DC cell surface markers composition. The virus increases the expression of class I and class II molecules of the major histocompatibility complex (MHC) (HLA-A, HLA-B, HLA-C and HLADR), CD83, as well as costimulatory molecules CD40 and CD86.

SeV suppression of regulatory T cells 
Experiments with animal models have shown that, even after UV inactivation, SeV can block T-cell-mediated regulatory immunosuppression in tumors. The blocking mechanism is associated with the stimulation of SeV inactivated virions of interleukin 6 (IL-6) secretion by mature DCs. These effects lead to the eradication of most model tumors and inhibit the growth of the rest. It has been shown that F protein alone can trigger IL-6 production in DC in a fusion-independent manner.

As a vector 

SeV has been known to the research community since the late 1950s and has been widely used to create numerous variants of genetically engineered constructs, including vectors for transgene delivery.  Creation of SeV genetic constructs is easier compared to other viruses, many SeV genes have a transcriptional initiation and termination signals. Therefore, constructing a recombinant virus is straightforward; the foreign gene can be introduced into the viral genome by replacing or adding viral protein expressing gene(s). SeV can include a foreign gene or even multiple genes of large size. It has been demonstrated that a gene of more than 3 kb can be inserted and expressed in SeV. Due to exclusively cytoplasmic replication, the virus does not carry the risk of genetic integration into the host genomes, which is a problem for many other viral vectors. The genome of SeV as genomes of other non segmented negative-stranded RNA viruses has a low rate of homologous recombination and evolves comparatively slowly. Multiple reasons for this genomic stability exist: (1) the genome is nonsegmented, therefore cannot undergo genetic reassortment, (2) each protein and each amino acid has an important function. Therefore, any new genetic insertion, substitution or deletion would lead to a decrease or total loss of function that would in turn cause the new virus variant to be less viable. (3) Sendai virus belongs to a category of viruses that are governed by the “rule of six”.   SeV genome as genomes of other paramyxoviruses mainly include six genes, which encode for six major proteins. Low rate of homologous RNA recombination in paramyxoviruses probably results from this unusual genomic requirement for polyhexameric length (6n+0). Natural high genomic stability of SeV is a positive feature for it potential use as a vaccine vector or as an oncolytic agent. For any clinical or industrial applications, it is important that SeV genomic and inserted foreign genes would be expressed in a stable way. Due to SeV genetic stability, multiple serial passages of the virus construct in cell cultures or embryonated chicken eggs without drastic genomic changes are possible.

Reverse genetic system 
The reverse genetics system to rescue Sendai virus was created and published in 1995. Since then a number of modifications and improvements were described for representatives of Mononegavirales, Paramyxoviridae in general, and for Sendai virus in particular. The entire length of the vector SeV genome, including transgenes, has to be arranged in multiples of six nucleotides (the so-called "rule of six").

Genes addition, deletion and modification 
Recombinant SeV variants has been constructed by introducing new genes and/or by deleting some viral genes such as F, M, and HN from the SeV genome. Reporter genes, such as those that are coding luciferase, green or red fluorescent proteins can be inserted in different locations in the viral genome. These locations include positions upstream of the N gene, between the N and P genes, between P and M, M and F, F and HN,HN and L,and after the L gene. 

SeV constructs have also been created with a modified protease cleavage site in fusion protein (F). The SeV F protein is a type I membrane glycoprotein that is synthesized as an inactive precursor (F0) that must be activated by proteolytic cleavage at residue arginine-116. After the cleavage F0 precursor yields two disulfide-linked subunits F1 and F2. The proteolytic cleavage site can be changed, so other host proteases would be capable to process F0.

Sendai virus based vector system that can deliver CRISPR/Cas9 for efficient gene editing was created.

Non-invasive imaging 
A set of different recombinant SeV constructs carrying reporter genes was created for non-invasive imaging of the virus infection in animals. The constructs allow to study dynamics of SeV spread and clearance. Some constructs were created to deliver a green fluorescent protein (GFP)  Some other constructs were created to deliver red fluorescent protein RFP. In addition, the constructs were created to express luciferase genes.

Sendai virus minigenome 
Sendai virus minigenome is a shortened version of its viral genome, in which most of the coding sequences of the virus have been removed. These removed genes can be replaced by a foreign gene of interest.  The minigenome can be multiplied in cells expressing a minimal set of complementary viral proteins or infected with a homologous wild-type helper virus. Sendai virus minigenomes are used to produce recombinant proteins of interest, and in a vector system to reprogram cells into pluripotent stem cells (iPSCs).

Reprogramming into iPSCs 
One of the latest applications of SeV-based vectors is the reprogramming of somatic cells into induced pluripotent stem cells. The SeV vector with a mutation that is responsible for temperature-sensitive phenotype was created to facilitate the erasure of the vector genome in a cell line. Temperature sensitive mutants of SeV encoding human OCT3/4, SOX2, KLF4 and c-MYC genes are used to infect human donor cells, but the resulting iPSCs became trans-gene free. One possible source of donor cells are human cord blood-derived hematopoietic stem cells stimulated with cytokines. Among these cells SeV achieves high transgene expression in CD34+ cells subset.  Another source—human primary PBMC, according to a technical note of TaKaRa human primary PBMC from donors blood can be directly reprogrammed into iPSC during 21 days period. Patient and healthy donors peripheral blood also can be a source of  CD34+ cells subset that can be reprogrammed into iPSC.  PBMC derived T cells activated for 5 days with anti-CD3 antibody and IL-2 also can be used for the purpose. In addition, human fibroblasts can be utilized for iPSC creation. The system for such reprogramming is commercially available from ThermoFisher Scientific as CTS™ CytoTune™-iPS 2.1 Sendai Reprogramming Kit, Catalog number: A34546.  The relevant video that explains the process of the vector creation entitled "How Does Sendai Virus Reprogram Cells? " is available online.

Airway gene transfer 
SeV vector is one of the most efficient vectors for airway gene transfer. In its natural hosts, like mice, and non-natural hosts, like sheep, SeV-mediated foreign gene expression can be visualized in lungs. This expression is transient: intensive during a few days after the first SeV administration but is returning to baseline, zero values, by day 14. After the second administration, the expression of trans genes is getting reduced by 60% when compared with levels achieved after a first dose.

MicroRNA expression 
A replication-defective and persistent Sendai virus can be used as a platform for a durable expression of microRNAs, which were able to inhibit expression of targeted genes.

For vaccine creation 
SeV has several features that are important in a vector for a successful vaccine: the virus does not integrate into the host genome, it does not undergo genetic recombination, it replicates only in the cytoplasm without DNA intermediates or a nuclear phase. SeV, as all other representatives of family Paramyxoviridae, is genetically stable and evolves very slowly. SeV genome can accommodate foreign genes in multiple intergenic positions and the SeV genome is suitable for introducing genes encoding the envelope glycoproteins of pathogenic viruses. For vaccination purpose the virus-based constructs could be delivered in a form of nasal drops, which may be beneficial in inducing a mucosal immune response. This form of vaccination is more immunogenic than intramuscular considering pre-existing anti-SeV antibodies. Sendai virus-based constructs can induce durable, mucosal, B-cell, and T-cell immune responses.  The virus genome has high similarity with human parainfluenza virus 1 (HPIV-1) and the two viruses share common antigenic determinants. The study that was published in 2011 demonstrated that SeV neutralizing antibodies (which were formed due to human parainfluenza virus type 1 past infection) can be detected in 92.5% of human subjects worldwide with a median EC50 titer of 60.6 and values ranging from 5.9–11,324. Low anti-SeV antibodies background does not block the ability of SeV-base vaccine to promote antigen-specific T cell immunity.

Human parainfluenza virus 1 (HPV1) 
Wild type, attenuated SeV has been used in clinical trials involving both adults and children to immunize against HPIV-1.The virus administration in the form of nasal drops in doses ranging from 5 × 105 50% embryo infectious dose (EID50) to 5 × 107  induced the production of neutralizing antibodies to the human virus without any measurable side effects. The results of these trials represent an evidence of safety for humans of replication competent Sendai virus administration. SeV antibodies that cross-reactive with HPIV-1 antibodies are present in most people, however, majority of people do not have high titer of these antibodies. The study that was published in 2011 demonstrated that SeV neutralizing antibodies (which were formed due to HPIV-1 past infection) can be detected in 92.5% subjects worldwide with a median EC50 titer of 60.6 and values ranging from 5.9–11,324. Low anti-SeV antibodies background does not block the ability of SeV-base vaccine to promote antigen-specific T cell immunity.

Human immunodeficiency virus type 1 (HIV) 
The development of T cell-based AIDS vaccines using Sendai virus vectors is taking place reached phase II clinical trial. Evaluation of the safety and immunogenicity of an intranasally administered replication-competent Sendai Virus–vectored HIV Type 1 gag vaccine demonstrated: induction of potent T-Cell and antibody responses in prime-boost regimens.

Respiratory syncytial virus (Human orthopneumovirus) 
Sendai virus was also used as a backbone for vaccine against respiratory syncytial virus (HRSV). This virus (HRSV), is a major cause of lower respiratory tract infections and hospital visits during infancy and childhood. It was shown that administration of SeV-based RSV vaccine protects cotton rats and African green monkeys from this viral infection. The HRSV phase I clinical trial  was completed in adults. It demonstrated high safety of the SeV-based construct that expressed HRSV envelope F glycoprotein.

Mycobacterium tuberculosis 
SeV is currently used in preclinical studies as a backbone vector for vaccine against tuberculosis. Mucosal vaccination with SeV construct generates memory CD8 T cell immunity and promotes protection against Mycobacterium tuberculosis in mice.

As a vector backbone for COVID-19 vaccine 
For effective prevention of infections caused by SARS-CoV-2, the ability of the vaccine to stimulate the mucosal immunity of the upper respiratory tract, including the nasal cavity, might be highly important. Such immunity is able to strengthen the antiviral barrier in the upper respiratory tract and provide reliable protection against COVID-19. It has been demonstrated that intranasally administered SeV can elicit strong mucosal immunity. Thus, mucosal vaccination with SeV generates robust IgA and IgG antibodies production by nasal-associated lymphoid tissue and by lungs of cotton rats. These antibodies facilitated rapid protection against human parainfluenza virus-type 1.

In China, Fudan University in collaboration with Pharma Co. Ltd. is engaged in development of the vaccine for COVID-19 prevention. SeV serves as a backbone vector in the project . Researchers from the Fudan University have significant experience working with SeV vectors; they created SeV based vaccine for tuberculosis prevention, which is in pre-clinical testing. There are two Sendai virus strains in China that were described in scientific publications. One of them is BB1 strain, which derived from the Moscow virus strain and has less than 20 non-synomic substitutions compared to Moscow strain. The strain BB1 was given to the researchers of Institute of Viral Disease Control and Prevention, Beijing, China by researchers of Ivanovsky Institute of Virology, Moscow, Russia in 1960s. Another strain is Tianjin strain, isolated in China in 2008. One of these strains was used for creation of replication deficient SeV85AB construct that is lacking fusion protein (F) but has inserted sequence encoding immunodominant antigen of Mycobacterium tuberculosis.  The safety and immunogenicity of this construct was tested in animal models.  This construct can be easily transformed into the construct that encodes S-protein of SARS-CoV-2. In Russia, State Research Center of Virology and Biotechnology VECTOR is in developing stage of vaccine against COVID-19 using Moscow strain of Sendai virus as a vector backbone. In Germany, the Max Planck Institute has developed the vir4vac platform, based on a respiratory Sendai virus, which is being focused on the SARS-CoV-2 virus. In Japan intranasal Sendai virus-based SARS-CoV-2 vaccine was created and tested in a mouse model.

Virus biology and properties

Virion structure 

Virion structure is well described in a published review. Sendai virus is an enveloped virus: its outer layer is a lipid envelope, which contains glycoprotein hemagglutinin-neurominidase (HN) with two enzymatic activities (hemagglutinating and neuraminidase). Hemagglutinin (H) serves as a cell attachment factor and membrane fusion protein. Neuraminidase (NA) is a sialidase that cleaves and removes sialic acid from the surface of a host cell. This cleavage promotes the fusion of the viral lipid envelope with the cell outer membrane.

In the lipid envelope of the virus located also a fusion protein (F), which is also a glycoprotein that ensures the virus entry into a host cell after viral adsorption. F-protein, as other paramyxoviral fusion proteins, is a trimeric class I viral membrane fusion protein. It is produced in the form of an F0 precursor that must be cleaved by host cell proteases into disulfide-bonded F1 and F2 subunits  in order for the trimer to become biologically active. Under the lipid membrane is a matrix protein (M); it forms the inner layer of the virus envelope and stabilizes it structure. The SeV virion also contains the nucleocapsid core, which is composed of the genomic RNA, the nucleocapsid protein (NP), the phosphoproteins (P), which is an essential subunit of the viral of RNA-dependent RNA polymerase (RDRP), and the large protein (L) that is a catalytic subunit of this polymerase. C-protein, which is translated from an alternative reading frame of the P-coding mRNA, is also associated with a viral capsid. It is present in SeV virions at relatively low levels (40 molecules/genome).

Genome

Structure 

The SeV genome is non-segmented, negative-sense RNA, of about 15.384 n. in length, and contains the noncoding 3’ leader and 5’ trailer regions, which are about 50 nucleotides in length. As in other respiroviruses from family Paramyxoviridae, in SeV they work as cis-acting elements essential for replication.  A 3’ leader sequence acts as a transcriptional promoter. Between these non-coding regions are located six genes, which encode the nucleocapsid (NP) protein, phosphoprotein (P), matrix protein (M), fusion protein (F), hemagglutinin-neuraminidase (HN) and large (L) protein in this order from the 3’ terminus. The RNA-dependent RNA polymerase of the SeV consists of the large protein (L) and the phosphoprotein (P). The structural gene sequence of SeV is as follows: 3′-NP-P-M-F-HN-L-5′. Intergenomic regions between these genes are three nucleotides long as in other respiroviruses. Additional proteins, which are frequently called non structural or accessory proteins can be produced from the P gene, using alternative reading frames. The Sendai virus P/C mRNA contains five ribosomal initiation sites between positions 81 and 201 from the 5' end. One of these sites initiates in the P open reading frame, whereas four others initiate a nested set of C proteins (C', C, Y1, Y2).  These C proteins are initiated in the + 1 reading frame to that of P at different translation starting sites. Sendai virus uses ribosome shunting to express Y1 and Y2 proteins that initiate at the fourth and fifth start sites on the P/C mRNA (respectively). Three additional SeV proteins are also encoded by P/C mRNA. Two of these proteins V and W are products of RNA editing, at codon 317 of the mRNA - G residues are added co-transcriptionally, (+one G residue for V and +two G for W).  The third - X protein is represented by 95 amino acids of the C terminal of the P protein and independently initiated by ribosomes. All these non-structural proteins have several functions, including the organization of viral RNA synthesis and helping the virus to infect rodent cells by escaping host innate immunity (see "The mechanism of viral immunosuppression in natural hosts" section above). It has also been found that C protein facilitates budding of virus-like particles and small amounts of C protein are associated with a viral capsid.

Evolution Stability 
The genomes of non segmented negative-stranded RNA viruses (including paramyxoviruses) have a low rate of homologous recombination and evolve comparatively slowly. Multiple reasons for this genomic stability likely exist: (1) the genomes of these viruses are nonsegmented, therefore cannot undergo genetic reassortment, (2) each protein and each amino acid has an important function. Therefore, any new genetic insertion, substitution or deletion would lead to a decrease or total loss of function that would in turn cause the new virus variant to be less viable. (3) Sendai virus belong to viruses that are governed by the “rule of six”.  SeV genome as genomes of other paramyxoviruses mainly include six genes, which encode for six major proteins. Low rate of homologous RNA recombination in paramyxoviruses probably results from this unusual genomic requirement for polyhexameric length (6n+0). Natural high genomic stability of SeV is a positive feature for it potential use as a vaccine vector or as an oncolytic agent. For any clinical or industrial applications, it is important that SeV genomic and inserted foreign trans genes would be expressed in a stable way. Genetic stability enables performance of many serial passages in cell cultures or embryonated chicken eggs without viral genomic change.

Viral proteins

Proteolytic cleavage by cellular proteases 
The SeV F protein is a type I membrane glycoprotein that is synthesized as an inactive precursor (F0) that must be activated by proteolytic cleavage at residue arginine-116. After the cleavage F0 precursor yields two disulfide-linked subunits F1 and F2. Paramyxoviruses use different host cell proteases to activate their F-proteins. Sendai virus uses activating proteases that are serine endopeptidases represented by tryptase beta 2-(TPSB2),WikiGenes - Collaborative Publishing (which has aliases such as tryptase II, tryptase Clara, club cells tryptase, mast cells tryptase,) trypsin 1 (PRSS1),  mini-plasmin (PLG)  and transmembrane serine protease 2 (TMPRSS2). Most likely, blood clotting factor X (F10) is capable to cleave and activate SeV F0. It is possible that other, not yet identified cellular proteases, can also process the F0 protein of SeV.

SeV cell entry receptors 

To infect host cells SeV must first bind to cell surface receptors using its hemagglutinin-neuraminidase (HN) protein. The receptor-virus attaching  process triggers a conformational change in HN, which allosterically promotes the viral fusion (F) protein to promote virus envelope - cell membrane fusion. The receptor attachment is cooperative with respect to receptor density. SeV cell entry receptors are represented mainly by glycoproteins and glycolipids. The table below lists all the molecules that have been shown to function as SeV receptors. Human sialoglycoprotein - cluster of differentiation (CD 235a) is an example of glycoproteins that facilitates SeV cell entry. However, other type of proteins that are not glycoproteins also can assist SeV to penetrate cells. Thus, C-type lectin represented by asialoglycoprotein receptor (ASGP-R, ASGR1) has been shown to be able to function as a SeV cell entry receptor.  Among glycosphingolipids two types of glycans are serving as SeV receptors. The first type is represented by fucosylated glycans and the second one by sialylated glycans. The number, positioning, and chemical linkage of sialic acid-containing receptors can be an important determinant of the strength and efficiency of viral attachment, which can play an important role both in host and tissue tropism.

The expression of  molecules that can facilitate SeV cell entry, frequently accelerates carcinogenesis and/or metastasis development. The asialoglycoprotein receptor is highly expressed in liver cancers. The presence of Sialyl-Lewisx antigen (cluster of differentiation 15s (CD15s)), which is a fucosylated glycan, on the outer cell membrane, correlates with invasion potential of malignant cells, tumor recurrence, and overall patient survival for an extremely wide range of cancers.  Expression of the Vim2 antigen, which is another SeV cell entry receptor represented  by fucosylated glycan, is very important for the extravascular infiltration process of acute myeloid leukemia cells. Metastatic cancer cells often are coated with glycolipids that are rich in sialic acids. SeV binds to α2,3-linked sialic acid containing glycolipids. For example, GD1a, which is a ganglioside and sialylated glycan (glycolipid), is found in large quantities on the surfaces of breast cancer stem cells. High cell surface expression of another SeV receptor - ganglioside sialosylparagloboside /SPG/ NeuAcα2-3PG. characterizes lymphoid leukemia cells. Among other receptors represented by gangliosides GT1b is highly expressed on the outer membranes of brain metastases cells that originate from an extremely broad range of cancer,  while GD1a, GT1b and GQ1b can be detected in human gliosarcomas. However, their quantity is not exceeding the quantity in normal frontal cerebral cortex. 

A fluorescence microscopy-based assay reveals that the relative number of SeV virions bound to the receptor can be defined as 0.5 for GM3, as 1 for GD1a, and as 2 for Gq1b. The structures of some of these receptors are available for visualization through SugarBindDB - a resource of glycan-mediated host–pathogen interactions. Others are available through KEGG Glycan Database, PubChem compound database, and TOXNET database (toxicology data network) of US National Library of Medicine.

Life cycle 
Because SeV is a negative-strand RNA virus the virus entire life cycle is completed in the cytoplasm using its own RNA polymerase.

Adsorbtion and fusion 
Sendai virus initiates infection process by host cell adsorbtion mediated by the recognition of specific receptor molecules. Hemagglutinin neuraminidase (HN) serves as a virus cell attachment protein that interacts with a specific cell entry receptor. NH has sialidase activity, and it is capable of cleaving sialic acid residues from the cell receptor. This cleavage triggers the fusion process of viral envelope and cell membrane, which promotes by cooperation of NH with the viral fusion protein (F). The SeV F-protein as other Paramyxovirus structural fusion proteins is a trimeric molecule  that belongs to class I viral membrane fusion proteins. To perform the fusion function F protein must be proteolytically activated from it precursor inactive form F0. This activation requires F0 cleavage by host serine protease before the virus adsorbtion (see the section “proteolytic cleavage by cellular proteases”). F0 must be cleaved by the host protease into F1 and F2 subunits that remained connected through a disulfide covalent bond. The cleavage site in the F0-protein is located N-terminal to the fusion peptide which has N-terminal Hepta-Repeat 1 (HR1) and C-terminal Hepta-Repeat 2 (HR2) domains. The illustration below shows 5 stages of the fusion of the virus envelope and cellular host membrane. 1) The pre-fusion, F protein (highlighted in red) is protruding from the lipid bilayer of the viral envelope and is in a close proximity to the cellular membrane.  2) Receptor-HN binding, during the SeV host cell attachment process, triggers the release of the fusion peptide from the F-protein. The peptide inserts itself into the host cell membrane. This insertion is accompanied by the transformation of the HR1 domain from a helical structure to an extended helical trimeric coil-coil structure. 3) Transformed HR1 domain attaches viral F-protein to the host-cell membrane. 4) Two lipid bilayers (viral and cellular) fuse with each other. 5) The fusion of the HR2 and HR1 domains of  the F-protein promotes the establishment of a stable six-helix bundle structure (6HB). The formation of the 6HB structure leads to the establishment of the pore and the completion of the fusion process. Viral genomic material enters the host cell through this formed pore.

Uncoating 
After a merging of the host membrane and the viral envelope, the SeV according to one model is “uncoating” with diffusion of the viral envelope proteins into the host plasma membrane. According to another model the virus did not release its envelope proteins into the host membrane. The viral and host membranes are fused and a connecting structure is made. This connecting structure serves as a transportation "highway" for the viral ribonucleoprotein (RNP).  Thus, RNP travels through the connecting structure to reach the cell interior  allowing SeV genetic material to enter the host cell cytoplasm.

Cytoplasmic transcription and replication 
Once in the cytoplasm, the SeV genomic RNA is getting involved, as a template, in two different RNA synthetic processes performed by RNA-dependent RNA polymerase, which consists of L and P proteins: (1) transcription to generate mRNAs and (2) replication to produce a positive-sense antigenome RNA that in turn acts as a template for production of progeny negative-strand genomes.  RNA-dependent RNA polymerase promotes the generation of mRNAs methylated cap structures.

The NP protein is thought to have both structural and functional roles This protein concentration is believed to regulate the switch from RNA transcription to RNA replication. The genomic RNA functions as the template for the viral RNA transcription until the NP protein concentration increases. As the NP protein accumulates, the transition from the transcription to the replication occurs. The NP protein encapsidates the genomic RNA, forming a helical nucleocapsid which is the template for RNA synthesis by the viral RNA polymerase.  The protein is a crucial component of the following complexes NP-P (P, phosphoprotein), NP-NP, nucleocapsid-polymerase, and RNA-NP. All these complexes are needed for the viral RNA replication.

Translation 
Two different sets of proteins are translated from viral mRNAs. The first set is represented by six structural proteins that include nucleocapsid protein (NP), phosphoprotein (P), matrix protein (M), fusion protein (F), neuraminidase (NA) and large protein (L). All these proteins have variable functions and are incorporated into the viral capsid (see the section “virion structure” above). The second set is represented by seven non structural or accessory proteins. These proteins are translated from the polycistronic mRNA of P gene. This mRNA encodes eight translation products, and P-protein is only one of them. Alternative variants of translation are represented by V,W, C, C’,Y,Y’ and X proteins. The proteins C’, C, Y1, Y2 are products of mRNA alternative reading frame, they collectively referred as C-proteins or C-nested proteins and they share common C-terminal end.  The X protein also shares the same C-terminal end and its translation also independently initiated by ribosomes. The proteins V and W are products of cotranscriptional mRNA editing. All these non-structural proteins have multiple functions, including the organization of viral RNA synthesis and helping the virus to infect host cells by escaping host innate immunity (see "The mechanism of viral immunosuppression in natural hosts" section above).

Transportation of RNP and viral proteins to cellular membrane 
After translation, SeV nucleocapsids (RNP complex) assemble, and move using microtubules network through intracellular vesicular trafficking pathway. In preparation for the budding process, three viral lipophilic proteins HN, F and M migrate through the secretory pathway to a host cell membrane.  It is assumed that the interaction of these three proteins with each other is needed for their migration to cellular budding sites. The binding of lipophilic protein complex to the host membrane facilitates the interaction of this three protein complex with the SeV nucleocapsid.  It has been shown that for efficient virion production SeV induces the β-cytoplasmic actin remodeling in its host cell.

Syncytium formation and direct cell-to-cell infection transmission 
Two of SeV proteins: HA and F, after their binding directly to a cellular membrane, promote a cell-cell fusion, which leads to a large multinuclear cell formation (syncytium). This formation involves the fusion of infected cells with adjacent target cells and remains an important mechanism of direct cell-to-cell spread of viral components. Thus, a SeV infection in a form of genetic material in partially assembled virions can spread without any exposure to host neutralizing antibodies (see the section "Directed cells fusion (syncytium formation)" for details and references).

Budding 
Sendai virus, as all other envelope viruses, uses host cellular membrane lipid bilayer for viral capsid membrane formation. Binding to a host cell membrane of viral proteins (M, HN and F) promotes their interaction with RNP complex, which is composed of the viral genomic RNA bound to SeV proteins (NP, P and L).  Thus, all viral structural components, including viral glycoproteins and genomic RNP complex, are getting assembled together. After such assembling the infectious viral particles are budding out from individually or collectively infected cells (syncitia). It has been suggested that recirculating endosomes are involved in viral RNP complex translocation. C-protein facilitates budding by interacting with AIP1/Alix, which is a host protein that is involved in apoptosis and endosomal membrane trafficking. The infectious virus particles usually released by 24 hours post infection (hpi), and peak titers appeared between 48 and 72 hpi.

Persistent infection 
Sendai virus can establish persistent infection in its host cells. Multiple rounds of virus subculturing result in a creation of new virus variants with high ability to establish persistent infection. These SeV variants develop certain genotypic changes. The persistent infection can also be established instantly in interferon regulatory factor 3 (IRF-3)-knockdown cells. IRF-3 is a key proapoptotic protein that after activation by SeV triggers apoptosis. IRF-3-knockdown cells express viral protein and produces low levels of infectious virions.  IRF-3 controls the fate of the SeV-infected cells by triggering apoptosis and preventing persistence establishment; therefore its knock down allows persistence to occur. It was also reported that during SeV infection replication defective viral genomes (DVG) are forming and selectively protect a subpopulation of host cells from death, therefore promoting the establishment of persistent infections. In nature enzootic disease patterns suggest that the virus can be latent and can be cleared over the course of a year.

Directed cells fusion (syncytium formation) 

One recognized feature of the Sendai virus, shared with members of its genus, is the ability to induce syncytia formation in vivo and in vitro in eukaryotic cell cultures. The formation of syncytium helps the virus to avoid neutralizing antibodies of the host organism during the spread of infection. The mechanism for this process is fairly well understood and is very similar to the fusion process employed by the virion to facilitate cellular entry. The activities of the receptor binding hemagglutinin-neuraminidase protein is solely responsible for inducing close interaction between the virus envelope and the cellular membrane.

However, it is the F protein (one of many membrane fusion proteins) that, when triggered by local dehydration and a conformational change in the bound HN protein, actively inserts into the cellular membrane, which causes the envelope and the membrane to merge, followed shortly by virion entry. When the HN and F protein are manufactured by the cell and expressed on the surface, the same process may occur between adjacent cells, causing extensive membrane fusion and resulting in the formation of a syncytium.

Using the model of cellular hepatocarcinoma (Hep G2), it has been shown that Sendai virus recruits the cellular protein villin for cell fusion and syncytia formation. The villin-actin interaction regulates the fusion of the viral envelope and the cell membrane. Thus, villin is a host cell cofactor that regulates the fusion process. Its down-regulation with siRNA inhibits SeV infection of Hep G2 cells.

The cell fusion property of SeV was utilized by Köhler and Milstein, who published an article in 1975 outlining a revolutionary method of manufacturing monoclonal antibodies. In need of a reliable method to produce large quantities of a specific antibody, the two merged a monoclonal B cell, exposed to a chosen antigen, and a myeloma tumor cell to produce hybridomas, capable of being grown indefinitely and of producing significant amounts of an antibody specifically targeting the chosen antigen. Though more efficient methods of creating such hybrids have since been found, Köhler and Milstein first used Sendai virus to create their revolutionary cells.

Sensitive cell lines, primary cultures and virus strains

Cell lines 

Scientific studies show that the following cell lines are susceptible to SeV infection to varying degrees.

Some of these cells (for example, LLC MK2, 4647 and HEK 293) do not express a protease that processes fusion protein F0 of Sendai virus; therefore, they produce non-infectious virions.

Type 1 IFN inhibits the SeV production in normal human respiratory cells, but fails of doing it in human cells that originates from variable malignancies such as U937, Namalwa, and A549.

Variable cell cultures obtained from tumors have different sensitivity to SeV, and can also produce the virus in different quantities.  There are multiple factors that are responsible for this variability. For example, an inverse correlation was observed between cells sensitivity to SeV infection and constitutive mRNA expression levels of TLR 3 and TLR 7 in primary cultures of prostate cancer. Thus, defective TLR-activated IFN signaling is one of these factors.

Virus adaptation to grow in cell cultures 
SeV strain variants adapted for growth in different cells have different properties. One study shows that the SeV variant adapted for growth in LLC-MK2 cells and the SeV variant adapted for growth in embryonated eggs differ by two amino acids in the HN protein. This difference results in different neuraminidase conformations around the receptor binding site and variations in neuraminidase activity between the two viral variants. Another research study shows that SeV variants, adapted to grow in cell culture 4647 (African green monkey kidney cells) and in HEK 293 (human embryonic kidney cells) instead of embryonated chicken eggs, also acquire mutations in HN gene and both SeV variants lost their oncolytic activity.

Primary cultures 
Ovine blood-derived and alveolar macrophages can be infected with SeV ex vivo. Experiments with a virus construct with an inserted green fluorescent protein (SeV-GFP) showed that infection reaches 100% of cells in 48 hours. Primary cell cultures of ovine skin fibroblasts can also be infected and also achieve 100% GFP positivity. In fibroblasts, an intracellular virus-associated GFP expression was stable at least for more than a dozen passages in cell culture. However, an infectious virus was not produced in these ovine cells. This fact was demonstrated by the transfer of supernatants from SeV-infected cells into fresh cultures. In addition, human skin fibroblasts can be infected with Sendai virus. SeV can replicate to high titers in human monocyte-derived DCs.

Persistent infection 
Most often, SeV infection initiates an apoptotic program in the host cells, which leads to the death of target cells without interrupting the life cycle of the virus. However, paramyxoviruses, including SeV, can cause persistent infection in primary cell cultures that does not kill cells or turn off cellular RNA transcription and translation. It has been demonstrated that mouse connective tissues cells (L-929) and hamster kidney fibroblasts (BHK-21) can become infected with Sendai virus and the infection can be persistent. The possibility of establishing a persistent viral infection was demonstrated in SeV-infected ovine fibroblasts.

Strains

History 
All Sendai virus strains belong to the same serotype. The origin of many strains of SeV was described in 1978. Some strains such as Ohita and Hamamatsu were described later. Ohita and Hamanatsu strains were isolated from separate epidemics in laboratory mice. According to the personal memory of Alisa G. Bukrinskaya, who has co-authored numerous publications related to SeV along with Prof. Viktor M. Zhdanov, starting in 1961, the Moscow strain of SeV was obtained by Prof. Viktor M. Zhdanov of the Ivanovsky Institute of Virology  from Japan in the late 1950s or early 1960s,  It is reported  that the BB1 strain derived from the Moscow virus strain. The strain BB1 was given to the researchers of Institute of Viral Disease Control and Prevention, Beijing, China by researchers of Ivanovsky Institute of Virology, Moscow, Russia in 1960s.

Virulence 
A field SeV isolate, that is attenuated through egg-passages, is less virulent for mouse respiratory cells. Therefore, the strains that were isolated from animals a few decades ago and went through multiple passages in eggs are less virulent for mice in comparison with the strains that are fresh field isolates.

Defective interfering genomes 
Defective interfering (DI) genomes or defective viral genomes (DVGs) are replication defective viral RNA products generated during viral infections by many types of viruses, including SeV. It has been experimentally established that DI genomes can be readily produced by viral infection at high multiplicity. A single amino acid substitution in a nucleoprotein (NP) causes an increased production rate of DI genomes in the SeV Cantell strain, which is known for its particularly strong induction of interferon beta (IFN-β) during viral infection. It has been shown that DI are responsible for this strong IFN-β induction.

Strains origin and sequence ID 

*The sequence of Enders strain is available from the US patent Modified Sendai virus vaccine and imaging vector

Strains sequence similarity

Virus preparation and titration 
Sendai virus can be produced using specific pathogen-free  (SPF) embryonated chicken eggs in accordance with the established protocol. Caution should be exercised in adapting SeV for growth in cell culture for oncolytic research. One research study demonstrated that Sendai virus, adapted to grow in cell culture instead of chicken eggs, loses its oncolytic activity.

The Sendai virus titer can be evaluated by serial end point 10x dilution assay of the virus-containing material in embryonated chicken eggs.  This assay evaluates the final dilution that may cause a viral infection in 50% of inoculated eggs. This EID50 assay is used to quantify titer for many viruses  that can be grown in eggs.A simple method of estimating fifty percent endpoints.  The measurement of virus titer obtained from this assay is expressed as an embryonic infectious dose 50% (EID50). The SeV titer can also be assessed by using plaque assay in LLC-MK2 cells and by serial end point 2x dilution hemagglutination assay (HA). However, the HA test is less reliable than the EID50 or PFU tests because it does not always indicate the presence of a viable virus in a sample. The dead virus might demonstrate high HA titers.

Availability of strains, constructs, proteins and antibodies 
Sendai virus prep. for scientific research is available from Charles Rivers Laboratory. The produced virus is available in liquid, or lyophilised form of allantoic fluid, or sucrose gradient purified. Greek company Bioinnotech also produces the Sendai Virus for scientific research  Sendai virus strain Z seed is available from ATCC, Cantell strain is available from ATCC, and from Charles Rivers Laboratory,  Moscow strain is also available from ATCC. Sendai Virus construct with the Emerald Green Fluorescent Protein (EmGFP) gene is available from ThermoFisher Scientific as CytoTune™ EmGFP Sendai Fluorescence Reporter, Catalog number: A16519. 

The manual for EmGFP . This EmGFP Sendai Fluorescence Reporter construct lacks the viral -gene (coding F-protein) in its genome, so it has a "mini-genome". To form a viral particle, which is sold  by ThermoFisher as a reporter, this mini-genome must be transfected into mammalian cells expressing the viral F-gene. This transfection of the Sendai virus mini-genomes into a special target cell expressing the F-protein results in the formation of virions that represent not transmissible virus. They have all the proteins in their capsid but have mini-genomes without the F-gene. Such virions are defective: they can infect mammalian cells only once, because, due to lack of F-gene in their genome they cannot produce this protein, cannot complete the viral cycle, and cannot form infectious particles. Therefore, tested target cells can be infected with such defective virions, but they can not produce infectious viral particles themselves. This type of non transmissible mini-genomes reporter system is useful for screening cells and looking for those that have Sendai viral receptors and a host serine protease for F-protein cleavage and processing. However, these mini-genome based non transmissible viral constructs are not suitable for studying cell viability after the viral treatment. The concept of the virus mini-genome is described in the section above entitled Sendai virus minigenome.

However, full genome transmissible GFP-labelled Sendai Virus is available from Creative Biogene, catalog number is OTV-016, and from ViraTree (SeV-GFP4). According to the publication that describes the creation of these constructs, GFP gene is inserted between M and F viral genes.

Recombinant SeV proteins in E.Coli expression system for scientific studies including F (aa 26-500), M (aa 1-348), V  (aa 1-384), L  (aa 1-2228), W (aa 1-318), N  (aa 1-524), C  (aa 2-215) and M protein (aa 1-348) are available in a form of recombinant DNA from Creative Biolabs Vaccine. The system for reprogramming of somatic cells into induced pluripotent stem cells is available from ThermoFisher Scientific as CTS™ CytoTune™-iPS 2.1 Sendai Reprogramming Kit, Catalog number: A34546. Sendai Fluorescence Reporter system that allows to screen cells for finding those that are permissive for Sendai virus infection is available from ThermoFisher Scientific: Catalog number A16519. Polyclonal antibodies to Sendai virus derived from rabbit are available from MBL international corporation (code pd029) and from Caltag Medsystems (catalog number PD029). Polyclonal antibodies to Sendai virus derived from chicken are available from Abcam (catalog number ab33988) and from antibodies-online.com  (No. ABIN6737444) . Monoclonal antibodies (IgG1) to F-protein are available from Kerafast (catalog number is EMS015) and to HN protein (Ig2A) antibodies are also available from Kerafast (catalog number is EMS016). Six different variants of mouse monoclonal antibodies to HN protein with different fluorophores are available from ThermoFisher Scientific with catalogs numbers Cat #51-6494-82, Cat #25-6494-82, Cat #12-6494-82, Cat #13-6494-82, Cat #14-6494-82, Cat #53-6494-82. The standard test for Sendai virus detection is the ELISA (enzyme-linked immunosorbent assay), however, MFI (Multiplex Fluorescent Immunoassay) is more sensitive.

References 

Murine respirovirus
Murine respirovirus
Murine respirovirus
Murine respirovirus